The ministry of Kesab Chandra Gogoi was formed on 13th January 1982. The formation of the ministry ended 197 days of President’s rule in Assam. The ministry ended after only 66 days, after Gogoi resigned during a motion of no confidence vote. Gogoi then recommended that the state again be put under President’s Rule.

History

Formation 
President’s Rule was imposed in Assam after the Anwara Taimur government failed to get the Assam appropriation bill passed by the assembly. On 12 January 1982, Gogoi told the press that he had the backing of 63 MLAs. Gogoi stated “I cannot reveal the identities of the 63 legislators whose support I enjoy for obvious reasons. But I am confident I will prove my majority on the floor of the House.” Gogoi then contested for the Leadership.

The Taimur Camp had encouraged Hiteswar Saikia to contest Gogoi’s claim but an opinion poll before the final selection revealed only supporters of Saikia among the 35 partymen assembled while 24 favoured Gogoi and 3 remained neutral. Hours before the selection meeting, 4 Taimur supporters resigned from the party. 

Governor Prakash Mehrotra accepted Gogoi’s claim that he had the support of 63 MLAs and he was sworn in as Chief Minister of Assam on 13 January 1982 at Raj Bhavan in a simple ceremony. He constituted his Left-Janata coalition ministry on 13 January 1982. For many MLAs support of the new government was fear that the Assembly may be dissolved if they don't.

Ministry 
At the time of the formation of the ministry, the foreigners issue was still very urgent. However Gogoi stated, "My government's policy will not be very different from the previous government's. There will be no reshuffle of officials. I am giving top priority to the solution of the foreigners issue and the maintenance of law and order. Apart from this, implementation of the prime minister's 20-point programme will be my major concern."

As Gogoi said, the ministry focused on Indira Gandhi’s 20 point programmes and he gave more emphasis on the implementation of National Rural Employment Scheme.

Motion of No-confidence 
On 17 March 1982 a Motion of No Confidence was moved against the 65-day-old ministry. Sarat Chandra Singha, Golap Borbora, Hemen Das, Promode Gogoi, Zainal Abedin, Premadhar Bora and Romesh Mohan Kouli jointly filed the motion. The speaker admitted it and fixed discussion for 18 March 1982. However, the speaker adjourned the house sine die after he learned Gogoi tendered in his resignation to the Governor. The opposition had a majority in the house however the Governor chose to dissolve the legislative assembly on advice of Gogoi.  

Gogoi, when asked why he recommended the assembly’s dissolution, said “I had no other alternative. If I did not make such a recommendation then the Governor would have had no other alternative but to allow the Opposition to form a ministry.” Opposition leader and former Chief Minister Sarat Chandra Singha called this “sheer fascism”. On 19 March, the President Sanjiva Reddy then issued a proclamation which dissolved the legislative assembly and brought the state under President's rule.

Cabinet

Notes

References 

Assam ministries
Indian National Congress state ministries
Cabinets established in 1982
1982 in Indian politics